Ziad Mal (also Romanized as Zīād Māl) is a village in Baghak Rural District, in the Central District of Tangestan County, Bushehr Province, Iran. At the 2006 census, its population was 45, in 13 families.

References 

Populated places in Tangestan County